Syrau is a village and a former municipality in the Vogtlandkreis district, in Saxony, Germany. Since 1 January 2011, it is part of the municipality Rosenbach.

References 

Former municipalities in Saxony
Vogtlandkreis